The 1999 Swedish Golf Tour, known as the Telia Tour for sponsorship reasons, was the 14th season of the Swedish Golf Tour, a series of professional golf tournaments for women held in Sweden and Finland.

Lisa Hed won two tournaments and had two runner-up finishes, and won the Order of Merit ahead of Marie Hedberg.

Schedule
The season consisted of eleven tournaments played between May and September, where one event was held in Finland.

Order of Merit

Source:

See also
1999 Swedish Golf Tour (men's tour)

References

External links
Official homepage of the Swedish Golf Tour

Swedish Golf Tour (women)
Swedish Golf Tour (women)